Gusevsky is an urban locality (urban-type settlement) under the administrative jurisdiction of the town of krai significance of Gus-Khrustalny of Vladimir Oblast, Russia. Population:

References

Notes

Sources

Urban-type settlements in Vladimir Oblast